The Ankos Festival  also known as Takoradi street carnival or Masquerade Festival is an annual event celebrated by the people of Takoradi, Ghana. Its main attraction is dozens of groups of people or teams dressing in wild outfits who display their skills and arts via dance. The festival is usually celebrated from 24–26 December of every year, and is popular with tourists.

Masquerades Groups 
These are the list of masquerades groups in Takoradi.
 Ankos 
 Cosmos
 Holy Cities
 Nyanta Boys
 Iron Fighters
 Unity 
 Missisipi
 Spain
 Sunnato
 Valencia
 Canadians
 Chinese
 Tumus
 Ohyewakomem
 Supreme
 Oil city
 Millionaires
 Unicon
 Addyzee
 USA
 Nyanta Boys and Girls

Ethnography
The various masquerades groups come together in the township of Takoradi to display their skills, culture and other arts to the general public through dancing and singing of various songs using brass band. The festival consist of different gender groups joining from various walks of life. It involves the young and the old who are much passionate about the culture and art during this festive moment. Their fancy outfit for the festival varies from one group to another. During the festival the brass band team play all kind of sounds, songs, melodies and tunes to spice up the festivity and also increase the excitement of various participant and watchers of the event who stand across the road, rooftops and balcony.

The Year of Return
The Year of Return was to mark the return of black people from the diaspora to meet and learn about Ghanaian culture and partake in local traditions and so forth. The Year of Return had a massive impact on the Masquerade festival because it had a lot of tourists, the majority being black people from the diaspora trooping into Takoradi to celebrate the festival.

2019 Artist
Kofi Kinaata
 Quamina Mp

Gallery

References 

Annual events in Ghana
Sekondi-Takoradi
Carnivals in Ghana